G. Michael Deeb is a Lebanese-American cardiothoracic surgeon. He serves as a Herbert Sloan Collegiate Professor of Surgery and Director of the Multidisciplinary Aortic Clinic at the University of Michigan. He has published 143 articles in journals and books and lectures both nationally and internationally on topics such as valve implantation and cardiac valve implantation.

Education and Achievements
Dr. Deeb received his Bachelors from the University of Pittsburgh in 1971 and his Medical Degree from the same University in 1975. He was a surgical intern at the University of Pittsburgh in both general and cardiothoracic surgery between 1975 and 1982. In 1982 he became the Assistant Professor of Surgery at Temple University Hospital and helped to establish the Thoracic Surgery department there. In 1986 he became the Assistant Professor of Surgery at the University of Michigan and became an associate professor in 1991 and a professor in 1996. He was the first to be awarded with the Herbert Sloan Collegiate Professorship. His clinical appointments at the University of Michigan Medical Center include: Director of Heart/Lung Transplant and Artificial Devices Program (1986-1995), Director of Adult Cardiac Surgery (1990-1999), and Co-Director of Heart Care Program (1996–present).

Surgery on Ronald Winans
Dr. Deeb was head of the surgery team who operated on Ronald Winans. After a failed surgery he told the assembled Winans family to say its good-byes, but the family asked if they could pray for Winans instead. Pastor Marvin Winans laid his hands on the surgeon's head, prayed and said, "You go back and take my son off the heart-lung machine. He will live." Deeb  was shocked but he complied. Winans lived, and Deeb later said that the experience had brought some spiritualism to his practice.

Personal life 
G. Michael Deeb was born in Pittsburgh, PA on July 25, 1949. He married his wife in 1988 and they have two children.

References

External links 
 University of Pittsburgh Biography
 University of Michigan Biography

1949 births
University of Pittsburgh alumni
University of Michigan faculty
Living people
University of Pittsburgh School of Medicine alumni